Thomas Kannemeyer (born 21 October 1988) is a South African cricketer. He played in five first-class, seven List A, and four Twenty20 matches for Boland from 2013 and 2020.

See also
 List of Boland representative cricketers

References

External links
 

1988 births
Living people
South African cricketers
Boland cricketers